Marius Ștefănescu (born 14 August 1998) is a Romanian professional footballer who plays as a midfielder for Liga I side Sepsi OSK.

International career
Ștefănescu was called up to the Romania national team for the first time by coach Edward Iordănescu on 24 May 2022, for the four opening group games with Montenegro, Bosnia and Herzegovina, and Finland in the UEFA Nations League.

Career statistics

Club

International

Honours
Sepsi OSK
Cupa României: 2021–22; runner-up: 2020–21
Supercupa României: 2022

References

External links

1998 births
Living people
People from Caracal, Romania
Romanian footballers
Romania international footballers
Liga I players
Liga III players
Sepsi OSK Sfântu Gheorghe players